The Indian cricket team toured Bangladesh to play two Tests and three One Day Internationals (ODIs) in December 2022. The Test series formed part of the 2021–2023 ICC World Test Championship. On 20 October 2022 Bangladesh Cricket Board (BCB) confirmed the fixture. However, on 23 November, the venue of the third ODI was shifted from Mirpur to Chittagong due to political reasons.

Bangladesh won the ODI series by 2–1 margin and it was their second successive ODI series win against India at home.

India won the first test match comprehensively by 188 runs. In the second test, while chasing 145 India lost 7 wickets for 74, but a 71-run partnership between Shreyas Iyer and Ravichandran Ashwin for the eighth wicket lead India to a 3 wicket win and India eventually winning the test series by 2–0 margin.

Squads

Prior to the series, Ravindra Jadeja was ruled out of the ODI series as he was yet to recover from knee surgery and he was replaced by Shahbaz Ahmed. Yash Dayal was ruled out due to a lower back injury and was replaced by Kuldeep Sen. Shoriful Islam was added to the Bangladesh's ODI squad as cover for injured Taskin Ahmed. Bangladesh's captain Tamim Iqbal was also ruled out of the ODI series due to a groin injury. On 2 December, Litton Das was named captain of Bangladesh for the ODI series. A day before the first ODI, India's Mohammed Shami was ruled out from the ODI series due to a shoulder injury, with Umran Malik named as his replacement. On the day of 1st ODI, Rishabh Pant was released from India's ODI squad. India's Deepak Chahar, Kuldeep Sen and Rohit Sharma were ruled out of the last ODI due to their respective injuries. Ahead of the third ODI, Kuldeep Yadav was added to the India's ODI squad. Abhimanyu Easwaran was added to India's Test squad on 9 December. Jaydev Unadkat was also added to India's Test squad after Mohammed Shami was confirmed to be ruled out of the Test series. On 11 December, Ravindra Jadeja was ruled out of test series with Saurabh Kumar and Navdeep Saini both were added to India's Test squad. Rohit Sharma was also ruled out of the first Test with KL Rahul being named as captain of India. Nasum Ahmed was included in Bangladesh's squad for the 2nd test while Shoriful Islam and Ebadot Hossain were ruled out due to their respective injuries.
On 20 December, Navdeep Saini and Rohit Sharma were also ruled out of the second Test.

ODI series

1st ODI

Batting first, India were bowled out at 186 with Shakib Al Hasan picking his fourth five wicket haul in ODIs. In reply, Bangladesh were reduced to 136/9 from 128/4. But Mehidy Hasan with Mustafizur Rahman added 51 runs for the last wicket partnership, which is the highest tenth wicket partnership for Bangladesh while chasing and overall fourth highest, to achieve the target with 24 balls to spare.

2nd ODI

Bangladesh were at 69/6 at the end of 19 overs. But the record-breaking stand between Mahmudullah and Mehidy Hasan helped Bangladesh to reach to 271 for the loss of 7 wickets at the end of 50 overs with the latter scoring his maiden ODI century. In reply, India were in trouble after being reduced to 65/4, then 107-run stand between Shreyas Iyer and Axar Patel gave them some resistance. At the end, the skipper Rohit Sharma who could not bat at his regular position due to finger injury, coming to bat at Number 9, hit a blistering knock of 51 off 28 balls which kept them on track. India needed 20 off the final over and 6 runs off the final ball, but Rohit Sharma could manage only 14 runs and eventually Bangladesh won by 5 runs.

3rd ODI

Test series

1st Test

2nd Test

Notes

References

External links
 Series home at ESPN Cricinfo

2022 in Bangladeshi cricket
2022 in Indian cricket
International cricket competitions in 2022–23
2022-23